Runaway Hills is a cluster of hills forming the northwest extremity of Arrowhead Range in the Southern Cross Mountains, Victoria Land. So named by the southern party of New Zealand Geological Survey Antarctic Expedition (NZGSAE), 1966–67, because both of their motor toboggans went out of control here, when going down hill.
 

Hills of Victoria Land
Borchgrevink Coast